Altangerel Perle (born 1945) is a Mongolian palaeontologist. He is employed at the National University of Mongolia. He has described species such as Goyocephale lattimorei, Achillobator giganticus and Erlikosaurus andrewsi. He has been honored by Polish palaeontologist Halszka Osmólska, who named the species Hulsanpes perlei after him.

References

1945 births
Living people
Mongolian paleontologists
Academic staff of the National University of Mongolia